Zuhab Khan (Urdu: زوہاب خان; born in Karachi, May 4, 2001) is a young Pakistani actor who started acting by doing commercials and moved on to acting in serials.

He starred in the drama Omar Dadi aur Gharwalay, Mein Mummy aur Woh, Kash Mai Teri Beti Na Hoti, Perfume Chowk and Na Kaho Tum Mere Nahi.

He also worked in 3 bahadur animated movie as a dubbing artist(Saadi) and he also started rap career. Zuhab’s first rap song is (My Story) and 6 tracks more and many more to come.

Television
 Omar Dadi aur Gharwalay 
 Main Mummy aur Woh
 Kash Mai Teri Beti Na Hoti
 Madiha Maliha
 Yeh Zindagi Hai
 Saans
 Qissa Chaar Darvesh
 Bulbulay
 Dugdugi
 Ek Hath Ki Tali
 Honeymoon
 Maana Ka Gharana
 Shaadi Ka Laddoo
 Mann Ke Moti
 Haal-e-Dil
 Na Kaho Tum Mere Nahi
 Perfume Chowk
 Malika-e-Aliya
 Malika-e-Aliya 2
 Kitni Girhain Baqi Hain
 Tishnagi Dil Ki
 Daldal
 Bholi Bano
 Dilli Waale Dularay Babbu
 Ghar Jamai (2018–present)
 Ghisi Piti Mohabbat
 Pinjra

Filmography 
 3 Bahadur (2015)
 Abdullah: The Final Witness (2016)
 3 Bahadur: The Revenge of Baba Balaam (2016)
 Examstic (TBA)

References

Pakistani male child actors
Pakistani male television actors
Male actors from Lahore
Muhajir people
Male actors from Karachi
Pakistani male voice actors
Living people
2001 births